Tentation delblush is a commercial apple variety (also known as Delblush) that was created in France in 1979 by Georges Delbard as the result of a crossing of Grifer (Blushing Golden) × Golden Delicious.

New Zealand is the sole southern hemisphere grower of Tentation, providing fruit domestically and to the northern hemisphere from June to September.  In the late 1990s, a selected group of New Zealand fruit growers started planting Tentation trees. It is also grown in the United Kingdom.

References

External links
NZ marketing site

Delbard breeds
Apple cultivars
French apples